Jadwiga Salomea Hładki-Wajwódowa (14 January 1904 – August 1944) was a Polish artist. She competed in the art competitions at the 1932 Summer Olympics. She was killed during the Warsaw Uprising in 1944.

References

1904 births
1944 deaths
Artists from Warsaw
Summer Olympics competitors for Poland
Warsaw Uprising insurgents
Resistance members killed by Nazi Germany
Polish civilians killed in World War II
20th-century Polish women artists
Olympic competitors in art competitions
Female resistance members of World War II